Calissons are a traditional French candy consisting of a smooth, pale yellow, homogeneous paste of candied fruit (especially melons and oranges) and ground almonds topped with a thin layer of royal icing. They have a texture similar to that of marzipan, but with a fruitier, distinctly melon-like flavour. They are often almond-shaped and are typically about five centimeters (two inches) in length. 

Calissons are traditionally associated with the town of Aix-en-Provence, France; consequently, most of the world's supply is still made in the Provence region.

History
The calisson is believed to have its origins in medieval Italy. Among the first known references to calissons was in Martino di Canale's Chronicle of the Venetians in 1275. An earlier 12th century text written in Medieval Latin used the word calisone to refer to a cake made with almonds and flour. Yet another candy that is thought to be a relative of the modern calisson is kalitsounia, which was made with marzipan, nuts, and spices such as cinnamon and cloves and was found in places occupied by the Venetians, such as Crete.

Some trace the introduction of calissons to Provence around the mid-15th century at the second wedding of King René of Anjou. Others suggest that it was not introduced in its modern form until the 16th century, as this was when almonds became an established crop in Aix-en-Provence.

Protected Geographical Indication (PGI)
The calisson status has been protected in France since 1991 which means that local manufacturers need to follow strict methods to make them and that only applies in France. During 14 years, the French Union of Calisson makers were not able to get the international rights over the calisson as they could not agree on the exact ingredients of the recipe. To prevent foreign companies from using the Calisson d'Aix name, the union applied for the Protected Geographical Indication (PGI) in 2015 but it was already too late. In 2016, the French Union makers started a long legal battle with a Chinese company who had already trademarked the candy in China under the "Kalisong" designation. In 2017 the French union finally won and blocked the Chinese trademark registration.

References

External links
 Calissons - Aix en Provence, Aix en Provence Office de Tourisme
 Le Roy René, producer of calisson

Aix-en-Provence
Almonds
Occitan desserts
French desserts
French confectionery